John Donaghy (25 December 1895 – 31 March 1936) was an English professional football manager who coached Dutch teams ADO Den Haag between 1928 and 1932 and Be Quick 1887 between 1933 and 1936.

His brothers Peter and Ted were also professional players.

References

English football managers
English expatriate football managers
ADO Den Haag managers
Hermes DVS managers
Be Quick 1887 managers
Expatriate football managers in the Netherlands
English expatriate sportspeople in the Netherlands
1895 births
1936 deaths